The Moshi Co-operative University (MoCU) is a public university in Moshi, Tanzania.

History
The history of this university dates to 5 January 1963 when the Co-operative College Moshi was established. The college's primary responsibility was training of human resources in the co-operative sector under the Ministry of Co-operatives and Community Development. The college was subsequently established through the Co-operative College Act No. 32 (Repealed) of 1964 as an autonomous institution with its own Governing Board.

In 2004, the Co-operative College Moshi was transformed into Moshi University College of Co-operative and Business Studies (MUCCoBS) as the Constituent University College of Sokoine University of Agriculture through the Government Declaration Order No. 22 of 2004.

In 2014, MUCCoBS was upgraded into full-fledged university. Former Minister Al Noor Kassum served as the chancellor. The institution offers certificate, diploma,degree, master degree and PhD programs 

Notable Alumni 
Paul Makonda. Dar es Salaam Regional Commissioner.

References

External links
 

Colleges in Tanzania
University of Dar es Salaam
Buildings and structures in the Kilimanjaro Region
Moshi, Tanzania